Mangalyam is a 1954 Indian Tamil-language film directed by K. Somu and written by A. P. Nagarajan. The latter also stars (using the credit "Naalvar Nagarajan") alongside B. S. Saroja. The film was released on 11 June 1954.

Plot 

Kumar is a young and rich doctor. He falls in love with the housemaid, Selvathaal. But his mother does not like their love affair and she chases away the housemaid. In the meantime, Kumar's sister falls in love with Kumar's friend Gopi. Selvathal becomes an actor with a new name Manorama. Kumar and Gopi go in search of Selvathal. Another person is after the actor. He kidnaps her and places her in a hideout.

Cast 

Male cast
 Naalvar Nagarajan as Kumar
 M. N. Nambiar as Gopi
 S. A. Natarajan as Raja
 K. V. Srinivasan as Balu
 V. M. Ezhumalai as Va. Mu. Kazhugumalai
 A. Karunanidhi as Mani
 T. S. Loganathan as Mangalakaram Pillai
 K. N. Kaleswaran as Kalai
 S. R. Dasarathan as Groom
Male Support cast
 A. R. Dhamotharam, M. M. A. Chinnapa,N. P. Noor Mohammed, R. Sathyendran, P. S. Marimuthu,R. T. Kurunathan, C. R. Raju, and Gauthama Das.

Female cast
 B. S. Saroja as Selva
 P. R. Sulochana as Lakshmi
 S. Mohana as Nalina
 C. T. Rajakantham as Vadivambal
 P. S. Gnanam as Jagathambal
 Rushyendramani as Queen Mangammal
 P. Kanaka as Roopayi
 Vijayakumari as Bride
Female Support cast
 Shanthammal, Komathi

Production 
The film was produced by M. A. Venu under the banner M. A. V. Pictures. K. Somu directed the film. It was made at Central Studios Coimbatore.

Soundtrack 
Music was composed by K. V. Mahadevan. Lyrics were penned by A. Maruthakasi and Ka. Mu. Sheriff.

Reception 
The Hindu wrote, "Nagarajan, in the leading role, gives a performance beautiful in its delicacy. The playing in general is impressive".

References

External links 
 

1950s Tamil-language films
1954 films
1955 films
Films directed by K. Somu
Films scored by K. V. Mahadevan
Films with screenplays by A. P. Nagarajan
Indian black-and-white films